The 1948–49 network television schedule for the four major English language commercial broadcast networks in the United States. The schedule covers primetime hours from September 1948 through March 1949. The schedule is followed by a list per network of returning series, new series, and series cancelled after the 1947–48 season. This was the first season in which all four networks then in operation in the United States offered nightly prime time schedules Monday through Friday.

The schedule below reflects the fall lineup as it all settled into place throughout October 1948, before any subsequent time changes were made and additional new series appeared in November.

New fall series are highlighted in bold. A number of ABC's new fall shows began as early as mid-August when the network first began broadcasting a seven-night schedule. CBS and DuMont also had some new shows begin in the latter half of August. These shows are noted as such by (Aug.). NBC began airing Saturday Night Jamboree in December.

Several notable programs debuted during the season and within the preceding summer. The preservation of these telecasts on kinescope film vary. The Texaco Star Theater proved to be one of the most notable hits of the year with its host, Milton Berle, credited with encouraging consumers to purchase their first television set. The 1948 episodes of the Berle show are missing, but many of the 1949 episodes still exist. A short-lived series, The Laytons, was the first network television sitcom to feature an African-American in a regular supporting role, albeit a stereotypical one. No episodes have survived. The Morey Amsterdam Show, which debuted on CBS in December, introduced television audiences to Art Carney as a lead cast member. In the David Weinstein book, The Forgotten Network, similarities between Carney's role as "Charlie the Doorman" and his later Ed Norton from  Cavalcade of Stars and The Honeymooners are noted. The Morey Amsterdam Show was not a ratings success. Four episodes are held by the UCLA Film and Television Archive. Toast of the Town, debuting in June 1948 and re-titled The Ed Sullivan Show in 1955 and a mainstay of Sunday night viewing, became one of the most successful and long-running programs in American television history. It would remain on the air until 1971. The premiere episode with composers Richard Rodgers and Oscar Hammerstein II and the comedy team of Dean Martin and Jerry Lewis are among the few missing telecasts.

Legend

Sunday

Notes: Toast of the Town, later known as The Ed Sullivan Show, premiered June 20, 1948, at 9:00 p.m. on CBS.

On DuMont, King Cole's Birthday Party, also known as simply Birthday Party, aired from 6:00 to 6:30 p.m. Eastern Time from March to May 1949.

Monday

Note: Beginning July 18, 1949, The Magic Cottage aired on DuMont Monday through Friday from 6:30 to 7:00 p.m. Eastern Time.

Tuesday

Note: Beginning July 18, 1949, The Magic Cottage aired on DuMont Monday through Friday from 6:30 to 7:00 p.m. Eastern Time.

Wednesday

Notes: On DuMont, King Cole's Birthday Party also was known as simply Birthday Party. The Laytons only lasted 10 episodes, from August 11 to October 13, 1948. Beginning July 18, 1949, The Magic Cottage aired on DuMont Monday through Friday from 6:30 to 7:00 p.m. Eastern Time.

On NBC, Picture This, hosted by Wendy Barrie, aired November 17, 1948, to February 9, 1949. The Black Robe debuted on May 18, 1949, and ran from 8:30 p.m. to 9:00 p.m. on Wednesday until it began to air at various times on Mondays during August 1949.

Thursday

Notes: On ABC, Blind Date debuted on May 5, 1949, airing from 7:30 to 8:00 p.m. Eastern Time. It moved to 9:30 p.m. during July 1949 and aired in that time slot into September 1949.

On DuMont, King Cole's Birthday Party also was known as simply Birthday Party. Beginning July 18, 1949, The Magic Cottage aired on DuMont Monday through Friday from 6:30 to 7:00 p.m. Eastern Time.

Friday

Notes: From April 14, 1948, to April 22, 1949, Russ Hodges' Scoreboard aired Fridays from 6:30pm to 6:45pm ET on DuMont. Beginning July 18, 1949, The Magic Cottage aired on DuMont Monday through Friday from 6:30 to 7:00 p.m. Eastern Time.

On NBC, Your Show Time replaced Musical Miniatures on January 21, 1949. Your Show Time had premiered on NBC's East Coast stations in September 1948, and began to include NBC's Midwest stations on January 21.

Saturday

By network

ABC

Returning Series
Hollywood Screen Test
Kiernan's Corner
Movieland Quiz
News and Views
Sports with Joe Hasel
Teenage Book Club
That Reminds Me
Quizzing the News

New Series
ABC Feature Film
ABC Television Players
Actors Studio
America's Town Meeting
Blind Date *
Bowling Headliners *
Break the Bank
Buzzy Wuzzy
Candid Microphone
Club Seven
 Critic at Large
Crusade in Europe *
The Gay Nineties Revue
The Southernaires Quartet
Stand By for Crime
Tales of the Red Caboose
Three About Town
Wrestling from Washington, D.C.

CBS

Returning Series
Face the Music
The Fred Waring Show
CBS Television News
To the Queen's Taste
Toast of the Town
We the People
What's It Worth
Winner Take All

New Series
Adventures in Jazz *
American Speaks
Arthur Godfrey and His Friends *
Arthur Godfrey's Talent Scouts *
Blues by Bargy *
Capital Billy's Mississippi Music Hall
Ford Television Theatre Hour
Kobbs' Korner
Lamp Unto My Feet
The Morey Amsterdam Show
Our Miss Brooks
People's Platform
Places Please
The Roar of the Rails
Ruthie on the Telephone *
The Sonny Kendis Show *
Studio One
Suspense *
Tournament of Champions
The Week in Review
Wesley

DuMont

Returning series
Camera Headlines
Charade Quiz
Court of Current Issues
Doorway to Fame
I.N.S. Telenews
The Jack Eigen Show
Key to the Missing
King Cole's Birthday Party
The Original Amateur Hour

New series
Admiral Broadway Revue *
The Adventures of Oky Doky
The Alan Dale Show
And Everything Nice *
Boxing From Jamaica Arena
Café de Paris *
Champagne and Orchids
Fashions on Parade
Front Row Center *
The Growing Paynes
Hotel Broadway *
Johnny Olson's Rumpus Room *
The Laytons
The Magic Cottage *
Manhattan Spotlight *
Newsweek Views the News
The Original Amateur Hour
The School House *
Spin the Picture * (originally Cut)
The Stan Shaw Show
Teen Time Tunes *
The Vincent Lopez Show
Window on the World *
Wrestling From Columbia Park Arena

Not returning from 1947–48:
Camera Headlines
Highway to the Stars
Look Upon a Star
Playroom
Small Fry Club
The Walter Compton News
 Western movie

NBC

Returning Series
America Song
Americana
Author Meets the Critics
The Bigelow Show
Camel Newsreel Theatre
Duffy's Tavern
Gillette Cavalcade of Sports
Juvenile Jury
Kraft Television Theatre
Mary Kay and Johnny
Meet the Press
Musical Miniatures
The Nature of Things
Stop Me If You've Heard This One
Story of the Week
The Swift Show
Television Playhouse
The Texaco Star Theater
Village Barn
You Are an Artist

New Series
Academy Theatre *
Admiral Broadway Revue *
Admiral Presents Five Star Revue — Welcome Aboard
The Black Robe
The Chevrolet Tele-Theatre
Colgate Theatre *
Fireside Theatre *
Garroway at Large *
Girl About Town
Greatest Fight of the Century
The Gulf Road Show Starring Bob Smith
The Hartmans *
Hopalong Cassidy *
Mary Margaret McBride
NBC Presents *
The Philco Television Playhouse
Picture This
Princess Sagaphi
Saturday Night Jamboree
The Ted Steele Show
Theatre of the Mind *
Welcome Aboard *
Who Said That?
Wrestling From St. Nicholas Arena
Your Show Time *

Not returning from 1947–48:
The Esso Newsreel
In the Kelvinator Kitchen
MLB
MLB on NBC
Television Playhouse
Village Barn
The World in Your Home

Note: The * indicates that the program was introduced in midseason.

References
 Bergmann, Ted; Skutch, Ira (2002). The DuMont Television Network: What Happened?. Lanham, Maryland: Scarecrow Press. .
 Castleman, H. & Podrazik, W. (1982). Watching TV: Four Decades of American Television. New York: McGraw-Hill. 314 pp.

United States primetime network television schedules
1948 in American television
1949 in American television